Bojan "Bo" Vučković (born July 17, 1970 in Belgrade) is a Serbian footballer, who owned and played for the now defunct Vermont Voltage in the USL Premier Development League.

Career

Youth and college
Vučković grew up in Belgrade, joining FK Partizan as a youth player in 1984. With the onset of unrest in Yugoslavia in the early 1990s, Vučković elected to attend college in the United States and in 1991 entered Franklin Pierce College, playing with the school's Division II NCAA soccer team. He was a 1993 and 1994 second team All-American and finished his four years with the school record in goals (99) and points (246).

Professional
Following college, Vučković remained in the United States and signed with the Arizona Sandsharks of the Continental Indoor Soccer League (CISL) where he finished runner up to Mark Chung in the Rookie of the Year voting.  That fall, he joined the Tampa Bay Terror of the National Professional Soccer League (NPSL) for the 1995-1996 season.  He was the ninth leading scorer in the league that season, with sixty-three goals in thirty-five games.

In February 1996, the New England Revolution drafted Vučković in the third round (25th overall) of the 1996 MLS Inaugural Player Draft. He played only one game with the Revolution before being released on June 28, 1996. He then signed with the New Hampshire Phantoms of USISL. That fall he rejoined the Tampa Bay Terror and would spend the next several years playing indoor soccer. While Vučković began the season in Tampa Bay, the team sold him to the Baltimore Spirit after only four games. He played the remainder of the 1996-1997 and the entire 1997-1998 seasons in Baltimore.

In 1997, Vučković played for the Rochester Rhinos in the USISL.  He then began the 1998-1999 season with the Kansas City Attack, but was traded to the Detroit Rockers after six games.  In April 1999, he signed with the Vermont Voltage of the fourth division USL Premier Development League. On January 30, 1999, the Rockers traded Vučković to the Philadelphia KiXX in exchange for Genoni Martinez and Joel Shanker. He finished the 1999-2000 season with the KiXX, then left indoor soccer to continue his outdoor career with the Voltage. Vuckovic briefly returned to indoor in 2001 for several games with the St. Louis Steamers of the World Indoor Soccer League. During his years in the NPSL, he was a two-time first team All Star and a two-time third team All Star.

Vučković was a co-owner, player, coach, and director of marketing for the Voltage until their dissolution.

References

External links
 New England Revolution Player Profile
 Vermont Voltage Player Profile

1970 births
American soccer coaches
American soccer players
American soccer chairmen and investors
Arizona Sandsharks players
Baltimore Spirit players
Cape Cod Crusaders players
Continental Indoor Soccer League players
Detroit Rockers players
FK Partizan players
Franklin Pierce Ravens men's soccer players
Kansas City Attack players
Major League Soccer players
National Professional Soccer League (1984–2001) players
New England Revolution players
Seacoast United Phantoms players
Philadelphia KiXX players
Rochester New York FC players
American people of Serbian descent
Serbian footballers
Yugoslav emigrants to the United States
St. Louis Steamers (WISL) players
Tampa Bay Terror players
USISL players
Vermont Voltage players
World Indoor Soccer League players
Living people
USL League Two players
Association football forwards